Phragmipedium reticulatum is a species of orchid ranging from southern Ecuador to Peru.

References

External links 

reticulatum
Orchids of Ecuador
Orchids of Peru